Cessole is a comune (municipality) in the Province of Asti in the Italian region Piedmont, located about  southeast of Turin and about  south of Asti.

Cessole borders the following municipalities: Bubbio, Cossano Belbo, Loazzolo, Roccaverano, and Vesime.

References

External links
 Official website 

Cities and towns in Piedmont